Pali is a city and capital division in Rajasthan state of India. It is the administrative headquarters of Pali District. It is known as "The Industrial City".

History
Pali (formerly known as Pallika and Palli) was a trade centre. In the 11th century AD, Pali was ruled by the Guhilas of Mewar. In the 12th century it became a part of the Nadol kingdom and was ruled by the Chauhans. In 1153 AD it was ruled by Kumarapala and his feudatory Vahadadeva. Then it came under possession of Songara Chauhans of Jalore.

The Rathore dynasty chronicles relate that Siyaji or Sheoji, grandson of Chandra, the last Gahadvala Rathore king of Kannauj, came to Marwar on a pilgrimage to Dwarka in Gujarat, and on halting at the town of Pali he and his followers settled there to fight alongside the Brahmin community from the raids of marauding bands and foreign invaders. rajputs and paliwal brahmins  fought bravely against feroz shah in 13th century but couldn't resist its  large army cenopath of brahmin warrior is still in pali known as dhola chabutra . His devali with the inscription of 1273 AD was discovered 21 km north west of Pali.

Rao Chunda, tenth in succession from Siyaji Rathore, finally wrested control of Marwar from the Pratiharas. His brother's son and successor, Rao Jodha, moved the capital to the city of Jodhpur, which he founded in 1459. Pali remained a part of the Marwar kingdom until 1949, when the last ruling Maharaja acceded to newly independent India. The oldest temple in Pali is the temple of Somanatha. Maharana Pratap was born in Pali. His birthplace is known as Dhanmandi Pali. Maharan Pratap's Statue inaugurated on 4 June 2011 by District Collector Mr. Neeraj Kumar Pawan.

Geologists trace the existence of Pali to pre-historic age and maintain that it has emerged from the vast western sea spread over a large part of the present day Rajasthan.

Historical relics depict the existence of this area during the Kushana Age, when King Kannishka had conquered Rohat and Jaitaran area, parts of today's Pali district, in 120 AD. Till the end of seventh century A. D., this area was reigned by the Chalukya King Harshavardhana who also conquered Bhinmal and most of the present area of Rajasthan.

After the Arab invasions of India this area was concentrated by Rajput rulers from all over India. During the period from 10th to 15th century, boundaries of Pali extended to adjoining Mewar, Godwad and Marwar. All Rajput rulers resisted the foreign invaders but individually fought for each other's land and leadership.

After the defeat of PrithviRaj Chauhan, the great warrior against Mohd. Gauri, the Rajput power of the area was disintegrated and Mewar and Godwad area of Pali become the subjects of then ruler of Mewar, Maharana Kumbha. But Pali city which was ruled by its Brahmin rulers known as Paliwal  Brahmins(rajpurohit)now, remained peaceful and progressive.

16th and 17th century saw a number of battles in the surrounding areas of Pali. Shershah suri was defeated by Rajput rulers in the battle of Gini, Mughal emperor Akbar's army had constant battles with Maharana Pratap in Godwad area. Again after the Mughals had conquered almost all of Rajputana, Veer Durga Das Rathore of Marwar made organized efforts to redeem the Marwar area from Aurangzeb, the last Mughal emperor. By then Pali had become subservient to Rathores of Marwar state. Pali was rehabilitated by Maharaja Vijay Singh and soon it became an important commercial center.

Role in struggle for freedom: Under British rule pali played an important role by pioneering the freedom struggle in Marwar. Various Thakurs of pali under the stewardship of Thakur of Auwa, who was the most powerful of all, confronted with the British rule. Auwa fort was surrounded by the British army and then conflicts lasted by 5 days, when at last the fort was possessed by the British army. But this heroic action of Auwa paved the way for continued and organised struggle for freedom.

Geography
It has an average elevation of 214 metres (702 feet  ).

Demographics

 India census, Pali had a population of 229,956. Males constitute 52.2% of the population and females 47.8%. Pali has an average literacy rate of 68.2%, lower than the national average of 74.04%: male literacy is 77.24%, and female literacy is 59%. In Pali, 13% of the population is under 6 years of age. Pin Code of Pali city is 306401 which comes under pali postal division (Jodhpur Region).

Famous In Pali
Pali is famous for its sweet named Gulab Halwa made from milk and rose .
It is also well known for Papad. Pali is famous for Mahraja Shree Umaid Mill which was established in 1942, a textile mill managed by L.N. Bangur group. It is named after Maharaja Umaid Singh of Jodhpur, grandfather of current Maharaja Gaj Singh of Jodhpur. He provided land of the construction of the mill.

Industries
Pali has been famous for its textile industries. Cotton and Synthetic clothes, and yarn are exported to other states of India at a very cheap price. Some new industries have also been developed such as those of Bangles, Marble cutting, marble finishing, etc. There is a cotton mill named Maharaja Shree Umaid Mills which is the biggest cotton mill of Rajasthan, employing nearly 3000 workers.

One of the biggest composite textile mill of India  'Maharaja Shri Umaid mills' (Estt. in the year 1940) is also situated at pali. Main production of this mill are cotton, Hank yarn etc. which are used to prepare different clothes. Main cloth production are cotton,  2* 2 rubia etc.

There are three industrial areas in Pali, namely, Mandia road industrial area, Industrial area phase 1 & 2, and Punayata industrial area. Mandia Road Industrial Area is the biggest and the oldest of all. Industries such as Jai Mahaveer Textiles, Shankheshwar Corporation, Dhan Shree Fabrics, Keshariyaji Tex Print, Mahamantra Mills India, Maa Ambe Texofine, Mahotsav Fabrics, D.Pawan Fab Tex, sunlight industries, Kundan Tex, K.B Shah, Nakoda Prints, Tulsi Cotton Mills, Mayank Process, Aadeshwar Process, Shree Ganesh Fab Tex, B.B. shah, Shri Arihant Cloth Mills, Shree Rajaram Group of Industries, Kohinoor, Kamal Agencies, Manidhari Impex, Sidhi Vinnayak Petro Chem, Shree Roopmuni Industries, Vam India Organics, Vidhya mills (India), Vidhya industries pvt ltd., Metro industries, Vijaya Fabrics, Manoj textiles, minerwa industries, Sikhwal fabrics, Mohini Process, Jov(Tex) Link, Sonu Group of Industries, Lodha Fabrics, Mega Tex Print, Vinod Group of Industries, M.B finishing, Mahaveer fab tex, Bajrang textiles etc. are among well known and reputed Textile Industries situated at Mandia Road, Pali.  Punayata industrial area has been always a question mark on local administration and RIICO because of its setup and evolution. But in the last few years, Punayata Area has turned out to be a major landmark for Industrialist to set up their new business.

Besides this, many more industries are situated in different areas of Pali district i.e. leather-based industries, agriculture instruments, Chemical Industries, cement industry, minerals-based units like stone crushers etc. Among these, granite industries have recently flourished due to the easy availability of raw material and favorable geographical location.

However, the problem of pollution is imminent. Common Effluent Treatment Plants (CETP) have been established in the last few years to treat the discharged water from various industries.

See also
Paliwal

References

External links
Pali District website
Pali Online News Website
Map of Pali District (Invest Rajasthan)

Cities and towns in Pali district
Pali district